The Sigma DP1s is a high-end compact digital camera introduced by the Sigma Corporation as an improvement of the Sigma DP1. It features a 14-megapixel Foveon X3 sensor (2652 × 1768 × 3 layers), a fixed 16.6 mm F4.0 lens (28mm equivalent), a 2.5" LCD and a pop-up flash.

The Sigma DP1s is a large sensor digital compact camera announced by Sigma on October 2, 2009.

The Sigma DP1s was announced on November 17, 2009.
The enhancements are related to the user interface and the shooting of backlit subjects and reddish unbalanced pictures. The user interface introduces the Quick Step function (originally introduced in SD14) that allows easy and quick modification of the main parameters. The picture quality is improved when shooting backlit subjects. The DP1 suffered from a high sensitivity to red light which has been corrected in the DP1s.

The Sigma DP1s was succeeded by the Sigma DP1x model.

Specification 
The DP1s is very similar to the DP1.

Software

Sigma Photo Pro 

Postprozessing of RAW X3F and JPEG of all digital SIGMA cameras

Version 6.x  is free Download for Windows 7+ und Mac OS  Version 10.7+  (6.3.x). Actual Versions are 6.5.4 (Win 7+) and 6.5.5 (MacOSX 10.9+).

See also
 Sigma DP1
 Foveon

References

Sigma Corp. DP1 Special Site (2007).
http://www.dpreview.com/products/sigma/compacts/sigma_dp1s/specifications

DP1s
Cameras introduced in 2009